The spotted nutcracker, Eurasian nutcracker, or simply nutcracker (Nucifraga caryocatactes) is a passerine bird slightly larger than the Eurasian jay. It has a much larger bill and a slimmer looking head without any crest. The feathering over its body is predominantly chocolate brown with distinct white spots and streaks (absent from most of the body in southern Asian populations, which are sometimes treated as a separate species, southern nutcracker N. hemispila). The wings and upper tail are virtually black with a greenish-blue gloss.

The spotted nutcracker is one of three currently-recognized species of nutcracker. The Kashmir nutcracker (Nucifraga multipunctata) was formerly considered a subspecies of the spotted. The other member of the genus, Clark's nutcracker (N. columbiana), occurs in western North America.

Taxonomy

The nutcracker was one of the many species originally described by Carl Linnaeus in his landmark 1758 10th edition of Systema Naturae, and it still bears its original name Nucifraga caryocatactes. The scientific name is a reduplication; nucifraga is a New Latin translation of German Nussbrecher, "nut-breaker" based on Latin nucis "nut", and frangere "to shatter", and caryocatactes based on Greek: karuon "nut", and kataseio "to shatter". The common English name nutcracker first appears in 1693 in a translation of a German travel guide, where it is a calque on the German name Nußknacker, as the bird was not recorded in England until 1753. Other Germanic languages have etymologically related names: Danish: nøddekrige; Dutch: notenkraker; Norwegian: nøttekråke; Swedish: nötkråka.

Subspecies
There are nine recognised subspecies

 nominate caryocatactes (Linnaeus, 1785) Scandinavia to northern and eastern Europe; Caucasus and northern Kazakhstan; winters to southern Russia
 macrorhynchos (Brehm, 1823) northern and northeastern Asia; irruptions to northern Iran, Korea and northern China; vagrant Turkey
 rothschildi (Hartert, 1903) Tian Shan and Dzungarian Alatau mountains, Kazakhstan and China
 japonica (Hartert, 1897) central and southern Kuril Islands, Hokkaido, Honshū and Hondo, Japan
 owstoni (Ingram, 1910) Taiwan
 interdicta (Kleinschmidt and Weigold, 1922) mountains of northern China (Liaoning)
 hemispila (Vigors, 1831) Himalayas (western Nepal to southern Kashmir)
 macella (Thayer and Bangs, 1909) eastern Himalayas to southern Tibet, western Nepal, northern Myanmar and southwest China
 yunnanensis (Ingram 1910) southeast China (Yunnan)

Some authors split this species into two, a northern species containing caryocatactes, japonicus, interdicta, rothschildi and macrorhynchos and a southern species including hemispila, yunnanensis, macella and owstoni, based on distinct plumage differences between the two groups.

Description

The spotted nutcracker is a dark brown, broad-winged, short-tailed corvid. Body plumage is mid-to-dark chocolate brown, heavily spotted with white on face, neck, mantle and underparts. It has a large white loral spot, a white eye-ring, blackish-brown cap extending onto the nape, dark blackish wings with a greenish-blue gloss, all white vent, and dark tail with white corners above and a white terminal band on the undertail. In flight, broad wings, white vent and short tail are noticeable; the flight undulating. The black bill is slender and rather long, sharply pointed, and varies in size amongst races. The iris, legs and feet are black.

Nutcrackers range from 32–38 cm in length (from tip of beak to tip of tail) and have a wingspan ranging from 49–53 cm.

The voice is similar to that of the Eurasian jay and is loud and harsh. It is described as kraak-kraak-kraak-kraak.

Behaviour

Feeding

The most important food resources for this species are the seeds (pine nuts) of various pines (Pinus sp.), principally the cold-climate (far northern and high altitude) species of white pine (Pinus subgenus Strobus) with large seeds: P. armandii, P. bungeana, P. cembra, P. gerardiana, P. koraiensis, P. parviflora, P. peuce, Siberian dwarf pine|P. pumila, P. sibirica and P. wallichiana. In some regions, where none of these pines occur, the seeds of spruce (Picea sp.) and hazel nuts (Corylus sp.) form an important part of the diet too. The forms that take hazel nuts have thicker bills for cracking their hard shells, with a special ridge on the inside of the bill edge near the base. If the shell is too hard, it holds the nut between its feet and hacks at it with its bill like a chisel.

A special adaptation is found in the tongue of the nutcracker. The tip of the tongue forks with two long pointed appendages which are keratinized into nail like surfaces. This is thought to help them handle and shell conifer seeds.

Surplus seed is always stored for later use and it is this species that is responsible for the sowing of new trees of their favoured pines, including the re-establishment of the Swiss pine (Pinus cembra) over large areas in the Alps of central Europe formerly cleared by man.

Various insects are also taken, and also small birds, their eggs and nestlings, small rodents and carrion such as roadkills. It digs out bumble bee and wasp nests avidly to get at the grubs.

Breeding

Nutcracker couples stay together for life and their territory expands between 20 and 30 acres. Nesting is always early in this species across its whole range, so as to make the best use of pine nuts stored the previous autumn. The nest is usually built high in a conifer (sometimes broadleaved trees are used) and usually on the sunny side. There are normally 2-4 eggs laid and incubated for 18 days. Both sexes feed the young which are usually fledged by about 23 days and stay with their parents for many months, following them to learn the food storage techniques essential for survival in their harsh environment.

Distribution
The spotted nutcracker has an extensive range forming a broad swathe east–west from Scandinavia right across northern Europe, Siberia and to eastern Asia, including Japan, inhabiting the huge taiga conifer forests in the north.

Three further disjunct populations occur in mountain conifer forests further south, one centered on the mountains of central and southeast Europe (the Alps, the Carpathians and the Balkan Peninsula mountains); another in the western Himalayas; and the third in western China seaboard and separated from the northern population by a relatively small gap in the north centre of China. See subspecies list above for race distributions. Some of the populations can be separated on bill size.

This species has a large range, extending over 10,000,000 km2 globally. It also has a large global population, with an estimate of between 800,000-1,700,000 individuals in Europe.

Spotted nutcrackers are not migratory, but will erupt out of range when a cone crop failure leaves them short of a food supply, the thin-billed eastern race macrorhynchos being the more likely to do this. Britain records very sporadic vagrants, but in 1968 over 300 nutcrackers visited Britain as part of a larger irruption into western Europe, probably due to a spell of early cold weather in Siberia.

References

External links

Spotted nutcracker videos, photos & sounds on the Internet Bird Collection

spotted nutcracker
Birds of Eurasia
Birds of Russia
spotted nutcracker
spotted nutcracker